The NHS Business Services Authority (NHSBSA) is an executive non-departmental public body of the Department of Health and Social Care which provides a number of support services to the National Health Service in England and Wales. It was created on 1 October 2005 following a review by the Department of Health of its "arm's length bodies". It began operating on 1 April 2006, bringing together five previously separate NHS business support organisations.

The body provides services to NHS organisations, NHS contractors and patients which include:
NHS Help With Health Costs
Student Services
NHS Dental Services
Administration of the NHS Pension Scheme
Scanning Services
NHS Jobs
Electronic Staff Record
Overseas Healthcare Services
NHS Prescription Services

Operations 
The NHSBSA manages over £35 billion of spend annually. This includes prescription and dental payments, and other transactions such as applications for medical exemption certificates and NHS Learning Support Fund submissions for student nurses.

The NHSBSA took over responsibility for checking prescriptions that had been dispensed free of charge to patients who claimed to be exempt from paying prescription charges in September 2014. To claim free prescriptions on medical grounds, patients are required to hold a valid medical exemption certificate, even if they have a life-long medical condition.

NHS Help With Health Costs provides free or reduced cost prescriptions through the NHS Low Income Scheme, medical exemption certificates, maternity exemption certificates, NHS Tax Credit Exemption Certificates and prescription prepayment certificates.

Student Services administers the NHS Bursary and Social Work Bursary schemes, including the NHS Learning Support Fund (LSF) on behalf of the Department of Health and Social Care. NHS Bursaries process applications for annual payments from the NHS to help students studying medicine, dentistry, nursing or healthcare courses in England. The Council of Deans of Health and Universities UK issued a joint statement on 30 June 2015 asking for an 'urgent' overhaul of student funding. Social Work Bursaries process applications for tri-annual payments to help students studying social work.

NHS Dental Services administers payments to dentists in England and Wales, and offers advice and information for dentists, commissioners and patients.

Dental, as well as Prescription, Provider Assurance services deliver performance and contract management activities.

NHSBSA administers the NHS Pension Scheme in England and Wales, offering services for members, employers and surviving spouses, partners or dependants.

Scanning services digitise medical records from across the NHS.

NHSBSA also took on NHS Jobs, the official online recruitment service for the NHS in England and Wales on 1 April 2018.

NHSBSA manages the Electronic Staff Record (ESR), the essential workforce management solution for the NHS in England and Wales, supporting the delivery of national workforce policy and strategy.

NHSBSA’s Overseas Healthcare Services manages the European Health Insurance Card (EHIC).

NHS Prescription Services is the largest organisational component of the NHS Business Services Authority. Its primary function is to determine the reimbursement and remuneration due when prescriptions are dispensed outside hospitals anywhere in England. Detailed information, collected when prescriptions are processed for payment, is then made available to organisations within the NHS, to support management, planning and governance activities. NHS Prescription Services has previously been known as the Prescription Pricing Authority, and as the Prescription Pricing Division.

Former operations 
NHS Protect, an anti-fraud unit, was part of NHSBSA until its abolition in 2017.

From 2006 to 2018, NHS supplier management – including procurement and delivery – was contracted to DHL Supply Chain and supervised by NHSBSA. Those services are now handled by NHS Supply Chain and Supply Chain Coordination Limited.

Personnel 
Silla Maizey is chair of the authority.

Michael Brodie has been chief executive officer since summer 2019. He had been finance director at the NHSBSA before taking a similar role at Public Health England on its formation in 2013.

Controversy 
Between September and December 2014, 18,000 penalty charge notices were issued to patients who had declared they were exempt from paying the prescription charge by ticking the back of the prescription to say they held a valid medical exemption certificate, when in fact they did not hold one. A campaign against the penalty charge notices was led by Diabetes UK, which argued that the need for the exemption certificates had not been properly communicated to people with diabetes. It said many people had claimed free prescriptions without any problems since they were first diagnosed, without having a certificate, until the NHSBSA's new, more efficient checking systems uncovered the problem. Following the campaign the health minister, Dr Dan Poulter, asked the NHSBSA to cancel or refund the charges until patients could obtain a medical exemption certificate.

References

External links

2005 establishments in the United Kingdom
NHS special health authorities
Organizations established in 2005